Justus Esiri (20 November 1942 – 19 February 2013) was a veteran award-winning Nigerian actor, generally considered to be one of the pillars of Nollywood with an acting career that goes way back to the 1960s. He came into prominence for his role in the popular Nigerian Television Authority TV-series The Village Headmaster and the film adaptation of Chinua Achebe's book Things Fall Apart.
He won Best Actor award at the 9th Africa Movie Academy Awards post-humously for his role in Assassins Practice and was also honored as the inaugural recipient of the "Goodluck Jonathan Lifetime Achievement Award" at the 2013 Nollywood Movies Awards. The Nigerian government honored him with several National honors with the highest being an Officer of the Order of the Niger, OON for his contribution to the development of Film-Making in Nigeria. He is the father of popular Mavin Records Musician Dr Sid.

Early life and career
Justus was born in Oria-Abraka, Delta State on November 20, 1942. He then proceeded to Effurun and attended Urhobo College, in the then Bendel State. He left Nigeria for Germany for his higher education. Institutions he attended in Germany included Maximillan University, Munich, German (1964), Prof. Weners Institute of Engineering, West Berlin (1967) and the Ahrens School of Performing Arts (1968).
While in Europe, he began his acting career. He was working as a German translator for the voice of Nigeria in Germany when he received an invitation home from the Nigerian Government to star in "The Village Headmaster" which he accepted.

Death and legacy
Esiri died in hospital in Lagos on 19 February 2013 from complications of diabetes. A tribute night, organized by the Actors Guild of Nigeria, was held at the National Stadium on 8 April 2013. Mass was at St. Jude Catholic Church in Mafoluku, Lagos, on 9 April 2013, and a Service of Songs was conducted in Warri the following day. His body was then taken to its final resting place in his hometown of Abraka. Several government officials and entertainment personalities were present at his funeral.

Filmography
He has appeared in several Nollywood and TV productions including
 No limit
Wasted Years
Forever
The Prize
Six Demons 
Corridors of Power
Last Night, The Tyrant
The Investigation 
The Ghost
Assassin Practice
Doctor Bello
Twin Sword
Keep my Will
Invasion 1897

References

External links
Justus Esiri at the Internet Movie Database

1942 births
2013 deaths
Best Actor Africa Movie Academy Award winners
Male actors from Delta State
20th-century Nigerian male actors
Best Supporting Actor Africa Movie Academy Award winners
Members of the Order of the Niger
21st-century Nigerian male actors
Officers of the Order of the Niger
Deaths from diabetes
Burials in Delta State
Nigerian male television actors
Actors from Delta State
Nigerian male film actors